Modati Cinema is a 2005 romantic Telugu film starring Navdeep and Poonam Bajwa. It was directed by Kuchipudi Venkat to music by Swaraj.

Plot
Sreeram is from a rich family. Sindhu is a middle-class girl with a nagging and gold digger step mother and a strict father. Sreeram is impressed by Sindhu at first sight. He helps her solve her family problems. In the process, she misunderstands him. The rest of the movie is all about how the two understand the power of their love and tie the knot on the same day they meet.

Cast

Navdeep as Sreeram
Poonam Bajwa as Sindhu
Brahmanandam
Tanikella Bharani
Harish Shankar as Harish
Dharmavarapu Subrahmanyam
Rallapalli
Suthivelu
Ali
Sunil
Venu Madhav
L.B. Sriram
Raghunatha Reddy
Subhalekha Sudhakar as Sindhu's father
Krishna Bhagawan
Raghu Babu 
Gautam Raju
Shankar Melkote
Krishnudu
 Ravikant
 Raj
Duvvasi Mohan
 Chitram Seenu
Srinivasa Reddy
 Meka Suresh
Telangana Shakuntala
Pavala Syamala
Satya Krishnan as Satya

Soundtrack

References

External links 
Indiaglitz review
Full Hyderabad review
2005 films
2000s Telugu-language films